NGC 3818 is an elliptical galaxy in the Constellation Virgo. It is at a distance of about 118 million light-years away from Earth. In the center of NGC 3818 lies a supermassive black hole. NGC 3818 was discovered by William Herschel on March 5, 1785.

References

External links 
 

Black holes
3818
Virgo (constellation)
Elliptical galaxies
036304